The family Acrasidae (ICZN,  or Acrasiomycota, ICBN) is a family of slime molds which belongs to the excavate group Percolozoa. The name element - comes from the Greek akrasia, meaning "acting against one's judgement".  This group consists of cellular slime molds.

Some would also consider it as a kingdom unto itself, but the debate is as yet unsettled.

The terms "Acrasiomycota" or "Acrasiomycetes" have been used when the group was classified as a fungus ("-mycota"). In some classifications, Dictyostelium was placed in Acrasiomycetes, an artificial group of cellular slime molds, which was characterized by the aggregation of individual amoebae into a multicellular fruiting body, making it an important factor that related the acrasids to the dictyostelids.

Reproduction 
When resources such as water or food become limiting, the amoeba will release pheromones such as acrasin to aggregate amoebal cells in preparation for movement as a large (thousands of cells) grex or pseudopod.  When in the grex, the amoeboids reproduce, resulting in fruit-like structures called spores, which develop into unicellular molds of the same species.

References 

C.J. Alexopolous, Charles W. Mims, M. Blackwell  et al., Introductory Mycology, 4th ed. (John Wiley and Sons, Hoboken NJ, 2004)  

Percolozoa
Excavata families